Park View may refer to

Places
 Park View, Iowa
Park View, West Virginia
 Park View Road, an English football ground
 Park View, Washington, D.C., a neighborhood
 Park View Estate in Mynydd-Bach, South Wales
 Park View Heights, Indiana

Education
Park View Primary School, Singapore
Park View School, Chester-le-Street, County Durham, England
Park View School, West Green, London, England
Park View School, the former name of Rockwood Academy, Birmingham, England
Park View High School (Loudoun County, Virginia)
Park View High School (South Hill, Virginia)
Park View Education Centre, Nova Scotia, Canada
 Park View School (Washington, D.C.), a NRHP listed site
 Park View School, Morton Grove, Illinois, United States

See also

 Parkview (disambiguation)